The 3rd Brigade Combat Team, 1st Armored Division is an Armored Brigade Combat Team of the United States Army, stationed at Fort Bliss, TX. First organized in 1944, as Reserve Command, 1st Armored Division, the unit fought in Italy in World War 2, in Operation Desert Storm and in Operations Enduring and Iraqi Freedom. The brigade has been stationed at Forts Hood and Bliss, Texas; Fort Riley, Kansas; Fort Lewis, Washington; and in Germany.

History

World War II

Cold War

Post-Cold War Peacekeeping

War on Terror

On 15 April 2015, the 3rd BCT was reorganized as an Armored Brigade Combat Team by reflagging the units of the 4th Brigade Combat Team, which was inactivated.

Current organization
3rd Brigade Combat Team, 1st Armored Division is currently organized as an Armored Brigade Combat Team, composed of the following units:
Headquarters and Headquarters Company (HHC), 3rd Brigade Combat Team (3rd BCT)
2nd Squadron, 13th Cavalry Regiment
 4th Battalion, 6th Infantry Regiment
 1st Battalion 67th Armored Regiment
 1st Battalion, 77th Armored Regiment
 4th Battalion, 1st Field Artillery Regiment (4-1st FAR)
 2nd Engineer Battalion
 123rd Brigade Support Battalion (123rd BSB)

Lineage and honors

Lineage
Constituted 27 June 1944 in the Regular Army as Headquarters, Reserve Command, 1st Armored Division
Activated 20 July 1944 in Italy
Inactivated 25 April 1946 at Camp Kilmer, New Jersey
Redesignated 27 February 1951 as Headquarters and Headquarters Company, Reserve Command, 1st Armored Division
Activated 7 March 1951 at Fort Hood, Texas
Reorganized and redesignated 26 June 1954 as Headquarters and Headquarters Company, Combat Command C, 1st Armored Division
Inactivated 23 December 1957 at Fort Polk, Louisiana
Redesignated 3 February 1962 as Headquarters and Headquarters Company, 3d Brigade, 1st Armored Division, and activated at Fort Hood, Texas
Inactivated 15 April 1995 at Fort Lewis, Washington
Activated 16 February 1996 at Fort Riley, Kansas
Headquarters, 3d Brigade, 1st Armored Division, reorganized and redesignated 16 April 2007 as *Headquarters, 3d Brigade Combat Team, 1st Armored Division (Headquarters Company, 3d Brigade, 1st Armored Division – hereafter separate lineage)
Inactivated 15 March 2008 at Fort Riley, Kansas
Activated 16 August 2009 at Fort Bliss, Texas

Campaign participation credit
World War II: Rome-Arno; North Apennines; Po Valley
 Southwest Asia: Defense of Saudi Arabia; Liberation and Defense of Kuwait; Cease-Fire
 War on Terrorism: Campaigns to be determined

Decorations
 Valorous Unit Award, Streamer embroidered IRAQ-KUWAIT 1991
 Valorous Unit Award, Streamer embroidered IRAQ 2003

References

External links
Brigade Official Web Page
Brigade Official Facebook Page
2-13 CAV Official Facebook Page
4-6 IN Official Facebook Page
1-67 AR Official Facebook Page
1-77 AR Official Facebook Page
2nd EN Official Facebook Page
123rd BSB Official Facebook Page

Armored Division 001 03
Armored Division 001 03
Armored Division 001 03